This is a list of universities in Kosovo.

Public universities
 Public University "Kadri Zeka" in Gjilan
 Haxhi Zeka University in Peja
 University of Gjakova "Fehmi Agani" 
 University of Pristina in Pristina
 University of Prizren in Prizren
 University of Priština in North Mitrovica
 University of Mitrovica in Mitrovica
 University of Applied Sciences in Ferizaj in Ferizaj

Private universities
 European University of Kosovo
 IBC-M International Business College Mitrovica
 AAB College
 RIT Kosovo
 European College Dukagjini
 Iliria College
 University for Business and Technology
 Universum College
 kolegji biznesi

References

External links
Higher education in Kosovo
Albanian school system in Kosovo

Kosovo
!
Universities